Deg (also known as Aculo, Buru, Degha, Janela, Mmfo, or Mo) is a Gur (Gurunsi) language of Ghana, with also 1,100 speakers in Ivory Coast.

Vagla is a related language.

References

Languages of Ghana
Gurunsi languages